The Reform and Development Party ( Hizb Al-Islah wa Al-Tanmiyah) is a liberal political party in Egypt.

History and profile
The Reform and Development Party was founded in 2009. The founders of the party are Mohamed Anwar Esmat Sadat, the ex-president Anwar Sadat's nephew, and the Egyptian billionaire Raymond Lakah. The initial license application of the party was rejected in July 2010. It was legalized in May 2011, just after the Egypt's 25 January Revolution in 2011.

The party participated in the 2011–12 Egyptian parliamentary election and won 9 seats in the lower house. The party merged with the Misruna party (Our Egypt party) in June 2011; the party name changed slightly.

Although the Reform and Development Party participated in the 2015 parliamentary elections, Sadat criticized the election process, which was delayed for 7 months, as well as the Supreme Constitutional Court being allowed to rule on complaints against election laws.

The party has gradually distanced itself from president Abdel Fattah el-Sisi, and Sadat briefly ran in the 2018 Egyptian presidential election, though he withdrew. Sadat criticized the pro-Sisi "Alashan Tbneeha" (To Build It) campaign on constitutional grounds for allowing government employees to publicly support the campaign. Supporters of his own campaign, "Benhab al-Sadat" (We Love al-Sadat), have been harassed by the government.

References

External links
 Official website

Political parties established in 2009
Liberal parties in Egypt
2009 establishments in Egypt